Penumbra is a Mexican telenovela produced by Televisa for Telesistema Mexicano in 1962.

Cast 
 Silvia Derbez
 Roberto Cañedo
 Azucena Rodríguez
 Antonio de Hud
 Carlos Navarro
 Maria Eugenia Ríos
 Rafael Bertrand
 Martha Patricia

References

External links 

Mexican telenovelas
1962 telenovelas
Televisa telenovelas
1962 Mexican television series debuts
1962 Mexican television series endings
Spanish-language telenovelas